The Orchestre de chambre de Neuchâtel (OCN) or Neuchâtel Chamber Orchestra is a Swiss professional orchestra.

References

Swiss orchestras
Neuchâtel